Under criminal law, a principal is any actor who is primarily responsible for a criminal offense. Such an actor is distinguished from others who may also be subject to criminal liability as accomplices, accessories or conspirators.

See also 
 Principal (commercial law)

Notes and references

External links 
 

Legal terminology